Cyperus wilburii is a species of sedge that is native to parts of Mexico.

See also 
 List of Cyperus species

References 

wilburii
Plants described in 1986
Flora of Mexico